Newport is an unincorporated community in Mendocino County, California.

Newport shipped lumber in prior times.

Notable people

 Steve Birnbaum (born 1991), Major League Soccer player

References

Unincorporated communities in California
Unincorporated communities in Mendocino County, California
Populated coastal places in California